Events in the year 1808 in Norway.

Incumbents
Monarch: Christian VII (until 13 March); then Frederick VI

Events
 Dano-Swedish War of 1808-1809: 
 14 March - Denmark-Norway declares war on Sweden.
 18 April - Battle of Lier.
 19–20 April - Battle of Toverud.
 20 April – 7 May - Battle of Rødenes.
 25 April - Battle of Trangen.
 18 May - Battle of Mobekk.
 10 June - Battle of Prestebakke.
 12 September - Battle of Berby.
 7 December - An armistice agreement between Denmark-Norway and Sweden came into force. It could be terminated on 48 hours notice, but was applicable for the rest of the war. The armistice broke 2 July the next year.
 Gunboat War:
 16 May – Battle of Alvøen.
 31 December - The Saksebøl Slaughter.

Arts and literature
28 January - The first issue of the newspaper Tiden was published in Christiania (now Oslo).

Births
4 March – Frederik Stang, lawyer, public servant and politician, Norway's first Prime Minister (d.1884)
17 June – Henrik Wergeland, poet (d.1845)
28 July – Ulrik Frederik Lange, politician (d.1878)

Full date unknown
Christen Larsen Arneberg, politician
Ola Antonson Holsen, politician (d.1864)
Nils Jønsberg, priest and politician (d.1885)
Hans Jensen Krog, politician (d.1897)
Sjur Aasmundsen Sexe, mineralogist (d.1888)

Deaths
29 April - Nicolay Peter Drejer, military officer (born 1773)
16 May – George Edmund Byron Bettesworth, navy officer (born 1785).
16 November – Envold de Falsen, lawyer, poet, actor and statesman (born 1755).
20 December – Arent Greve, goldsmith and painter (born 1733).

See also

References